The 2013–14 BYU Cougars men's basketball team represented Brigham Young University in the 2013–14 NCAA Division I men's basketball season. This was head coach Dave Rose's ninth season at BYU and the Cougars third season in the West Coast Conference. The Cougars played their home games at the Marriott Center. They finished the season 23–12, 13–5 in WCC play to finish in a tie for second place. They advanced to the championship game of the WCC tournament where they lost to Gonzaga. They received an at large bid to the NCAA tournament where they lost in the second round to Oregon.

Before the season

Departures

Recruiting
As early recruiting began, BYU had 5 players commit to play. Three of the players- Nick Emery, Jakob Hartsock, and Braiden Shaw, plan to serve two-year church missions before joining the team for the 2015-16 season. The other two plan to join BYU and play during the 2013-14 season. During late recruitment, the Cougars had one JC Player decide to transfer to BYU in Skyler Halford.

2013–14 return missionaries
For the 2013-14 season, Coach Rose announced that Kyle Collinsworth would return from his mission in the summer of 2013 and resume playing as a forward for the BYU team. Collinsworth had been serving as a two-year church missionary in Russia.

Coaching
BYU also unveiled a surprise face as a new member of the coaching staff. Noah Hartsock returned from Spain to pursue his graduate degree and was named as a Student Assistant.

2013–14 media

Nu Skin Cougar IMG Sports Network

KSL 102.7 FM and 1160 AM- Flagship Station (Salt Lake City/ Provo, UT and ksl.com)
BYU Radio- Nationwide (Dish Network 980, Sirius XM 143, and byuradio.org)
KTHK- Blackfoot/ Idaho Falls/ Pocatello/ Rexburg, ID
KMGR- Manti, UT
KSUB- Cedar City, UT
KDXU- St. George, UT

Roster

Schedule

|-
!colspan=8 style="background:#002654; color:#FFFFFF;"|Exhibition

|-
!colspan=8 style="background:#002654; color:white;"| Regular season

|-
!colspan=8 style="background:#002654;"| 2014 WCC tournament

|-
!colspan=8 style="background:#002654;"| 2014 NCAA tournament

Game summaries

Cougar Tipoff
Broadcasters: Spencer Linton, David Nixon, Jake Edmonds, and Justin Ashby
Stats reset at Halftime and players moved onto different squads. Also done differently was a running clock in the first half and a regular clock in the second half. The first half featured mixed squads while the second half featured regulars vs. Redshirts, Walk-ons, and Practice Squad. Jordan Ellis, Andrew Topham, Austin Winegar, & Tyler Nicholas- 4 practice squad members, participate in the second half. Nate Austin would only play 1 minute. He was pulled after his tooth got broke during the game.

Rosters: 
 BYU White (1st Half)-  Eric Mika, Matt Carlino, Skyler Halford, Chase Fischer, Nate Austin, Josh Sharp, Andrew Johnston, Graham Pingree
 BYU White (2nd Half)- Eric Mika, Matt Carlino, Tyler Haws, Kyle Collinsworth, Josh Sharp, Anson Winder, Skyler Halford, Frank Bartley IV, Luke Worthington
 BYU Blue (1st Half)- Tyler Haws, Kyle Collinsworth, Anson Winder, Frank Bartley IV, Luke Worthington
 BYU Blue (2nd Half)- Jordan Ellis, Andrew Johnston, Chase Fischer, Andrew Topham, Graham Pingree, Austin Winegar, Tyler Nicholas

Exhibition: Colorado College
Broadcasters: Dave McCann, Blaine Fowler, and Lauren Francom
Series History: BYU leads regular season series history 11-5-6 with all matches having occurred between 1923 and 1936.
Starting Lineups:
 BYU: Matt Carlino, Tyler Haws, Anson Winder, Kyle Collinsworth, Eric Mika
 Colorado College: Ryan Milne, Justin Bernardino, James Lonergan, Daniel Webb, Chris Lesnansky

Exhibition: Alaska-Anchorage
Broadcasters: Spencer Linton, David Nixon, and Lauren Francom
Series History: BYU leads regular season series 1-0
Starting Lineups:
BYU: Nate Austin, Tyler Haws, Kyle Collinsworth, Frank Bartley IV, Matt Carlino
Alaska-Anchorage: Kyle Fossman, Travis Thompson, Brian McGill, Teancum Stafford, Brad Mears

Weber State
Broadcasters: Spencer Linton, David Nixon, and Lauren Francom
Series History: BYU leads series 28-10
Starting Lineups:
BYU: Matt Carlino, Kyle Collinsworth, Tyler Haws, Nate Austin, Eric Mika
Weber State: Jordan Richardson, Jeremy Senglin, Davion Berry, Joel Bolomboy, Kyle Tresnak

Stanford
Broadcasters: Dave Pasch and Seth Greenberg
Series History: BYU leads series 4-2
Starting Lineups:
BYU: Matt Carlino, Kyle Collinsworth, Tyler Haws, Nate Austin, Eric Mika
Stanford: Chasson Randle, Anthony Brown, Josh Huestis, Dwight Powell, Stefan Nastic

CBE Classic: Mount Saint Mary's
Broadcasters: Dave McCann, Blaine Fowler, and Spencer Linton 
Series History: First Meeting
Starting Lineups: 
BYU: Matt Carlino, Kyle Collinsworth, Anson Winder, Nate Austin, Eric Mika
Mt. Saint Mary's: Byron Ash, Julian Norfleet, Sam Prescott, Gregory Graves, Kristijan Krajina

CBE Classic: Colorado Mesa
Broadcasters: Dave McCann, Blaine Fowler, and Spencer Linton 
Series History: First Metting
Starting Lineups: 
BYU: Matt Carlino, Kyle Collinsworth, Anson Winder, Nate Austin, Eric Mika
Colorado Mesa: Landon Vermeer, Jon Orr, Clay Kame, Carlos Perez, Joe Kiely

#21 Iowa State
Broadcasters: Roxy Bernstein and Miles Simon
Series History: Iowa State leads series 5-0 
Starting Lineups: 
BYU- Matt Carlino, Tyler Haws, Kyle Collinsworth, Nate Austin, Eric Mika
Iowa State- Georges Niang, Dustin Hogue, Matt Thomas, DeAndre Kane, Naz Long

CBE Classic: Texas
Broadcasters: Mark Neely and Sean Farnham
Series History: BYU leads 3-2
Starting Lineups:
BYU- Tyler Haws, Matt Carlino, Kyle Collinsworth, Nate Austin, Eric Mika
Texas- Isaiah Taylor, Damarcus Holland, Damarcus Croaker, Jonathan Holmes, Cameron Ridley

CBE Classic: #12 Wichita State 
Broadcasters: Mark Neely and Sean Farnham
Series History: Wichita State leads 6-1
Starting Lineups: 
BYU- Tyler Haws, Matt Carlino, Kyle Collinsworth, Nate Austin, Eric Mika
Wichita State- Cleanthony Early, Kadeem Coleby, Fred VanVleet, Tekele Cotton, Ron Baker

Utah State
Broadcasters: Dave McCann, Blaine Fowler, and Lauren Francom
Series History: BYU leads series 137-92
Starting Lineups: 
BYU: Matt Carlino, Kyle Collinsworth, Tyler Haws, Nate Austin, Eric Mika
Utah State: Jarred Shaw, Preston Medlin, Spencer Butterfield, Kyle Davis, Tenale Roland

North Texas
Broadcasters: Dave McCann, Blaine Fowler, and Spencer Linton
Series History: BYU leads 2-0
Starting Lineups: 
BYU- Tyler Haws, Matt Carlino, Kyle Collinsworth, Nate Austin, Eric Mika
North Texas- Chris Jones, Vertrail Vaughns, Alzee Williams, Colin Voss, Keith Coleman

#21 UMass
Broadcasters: John Sadak and Pete Gillen
Series History: First Meeting
Starting Lineups: 
BYU: Matt Carlino, Kyle Collinsworth, Tyler Haws, Nate Austin, Eric Mika
UMass: Cady Lalanne, Sampson Carter, Raphiael Putney, Chaz Williams, Derrick Gordon

Prairie View A&M
Broadcasters: Dave McCann, David Nixon, and Spencer Linton
Series History: BYU leads 1-0
Starting Lineups: 
BYU- Tyler Haws, Matt Carlino, Kyle Collinsworth, Nate Austin, Eric Mika
Prairie View A&M- John Brisco, Trey Hagood, Montrael Scott, Hershey Robinson, Reggis Onwukamuche

Utah
Broadcasters: Rich Cellini and Dan Dickau
Series History: BYU leads 129-125
Starting Lineups: 
BYU: Matt Carlino, Kyle Collinsworth, Tyler Haws, Nate Austin, Eric Mika
Utah: Jordan Loveridge, Renan Lenz, Dakarai Tucker, Brandon Taylor, Delon Wright

#13 Oregon
Broadcasters: JB Long and Ernie Kent
Series History: Oregon leads 12-9
Starting Lineups: 
BYU- Tyler Haws, Matt Carlino, Kyle Collinsworth, Nate Austin, Eric Mika
Oregon- Joseph Young, Mike Moser, Johnathan Loyd, Damyean Dotson, Waverly Austin

Loyola Marymount
Broadcasters: Barry Tompkins and Jarron Collins
Series History: BYU leads 4-3
Starting Lineups: 
BYU: Matt Carlino, Kyle Collinsworth, Tyler Haws, Nate Austin, Eric Mika
LMU: Evan Payne, Anthony Ireland, CJ Blackwell, Gabe Levin, Alex Osborne

Pepperdine
Broadcasters: Ari Wolfe, Jarron Collins, and Kelli Tennant
Series History: BYU leads 8-4
Starting Lineups: 
BYU: Tyler Haws, Matt Carlino, Kyle Collinsworth, Nate Austin, Eric Mika
Pepperdine: Jeremy Major, Atif Russell, Malcolm Brooks, Stacy Davis, Brendan Lane

San Diego
Broadcasters: Dave McCann, David Nixon, and Spencer Linton
Series History: BYU leads 6-2
Starting Lineups: 
BYU: Kyle Collinsworth, Tyler Haws, Skyler Halford, Nate Austin, Eric Mika
San Diego: Christopher Anderson, Johnny Dee, Brett Bailey, Jito Kok, Dennis Kramer

Pepperdine
Broadcasters: Dave McCann, Blaine Fowler, and Spencer Linton
Series History: BYU leads 8-5
Starting Lineups: 
BYU: Tyler Haws, Skyler Halford, Kyle Collinsworth, Nate Austin, Josh Sharp
Pepperdine: Jeremy Major, Malcolm Brooks, Lamond Murray Jr., Stacy Davis, Jett Raines

Loyola Marymount
Broadcasters: Dave McCann, David Nixon, and Spencer Linton
Series History: Series Even 4-4
Starting Lineups: 
BYU: Kyle Collinsworth, Tyler Haws, Skyler Halford, Nate Austin, Josh Sharp
LMU: Evan Payne, Anthony Ireland, Nick Stover, Gabe Levin, Alex Osborne

San Francisco
Broadcasters: Roxy Bernstein and Corey Williams
Series History: BYU leads 8-7
Starting Lineups: 
BYU: Tyler Haws, Skyler Halford, Kyle Collinsworth, Nate Austin, Eric Mika
San Francisco: Matt Glover, Avry Holmes, Kruize Pinkins, Mark Tollefsen, Cole Dickerson

Santa Clara
Broadcasters: Glen Kuiper and Dan Belluomini
Series History: BYU leads 19-5
Starting Lineups: 
BYU: Kyle Collinsworth, Tyler Haws, Skyler Halford, Nate Austin, Eric Mika
Santa Clara: Jerry Brown, Brandon Clark, Jalen Richard, Jared Brownridge, Yannick Atanga

Portland
Broadcasters: Tom Glasgow and Bill Krueger
Series History: BYU leads 9-0
Starting Lineups: 
BYU: Kyle Collinsworth, Tyler Haws, Skyler Halford, Nate Austin, Eric Mika
Portland: Kevin Bailey, Bryce Pressley, Alec Wintering, Thomas Van Der Mars, Ryan Nicholas

Gonzaga
Broadcasters: Beth Mowins and Kara Lawson
Series History: Gonzaga leads 5-2
Starting Lineups: 
BYU: Kyle Collinsworth, Tyler Haws, Skyler Halford, Nate Austin, Eric Mika
Gonzaga: Kyle Dranginis, Kevin Pangos, David Stockton, Przemek Karnowski, Sam Dower Jr.

Pacific
Broadcasters: Dave McCann, David Nixon, and Spencer Linton
Series History: Series tied 3-3
Starting Lineups: 
BYU: Kyle Collinsworth, Tyler Haws, Skyler Halford, Nate Austin, Eric Mika
Pacific: Sama Taku, Andrew Bock, Trevin Harris, Ross Rivera, Khalil Kelley

Saint Mary's
Broadcasters: Beth Mowins and Kara Lawson
Series History: BYU leads 8-6
Starting Lineups: 
BYU: Kyle Collinsworth, Tyler Haws, Skyler Halford, Nate Austin, Eric Mika
Saint Mary's: Brad Waldow, Kerry Carter, Dane Pineau, Stephen Holt, James Walker III

Santa Clara
Broadcasters: Roxy Bernstein and Corey Williams
Series History: BYU leads 20-5
Starting Lineups: 
BYU: Kyle Collinsworth, Tyler Haws, Skyler Halford, Nate Austin, Eric Mika
Santa Clara: John McArthur, Brandon Clark, Jalen Richard, Jared Brownridge, Yannick Atanga

San Francisco
Broadcasters: Spencer Linton, Blaine Fowler, and Lauren Francom
Series History: BYU leads 9-7
Starting Lineups: 
BYU: Tyler Haws, Skyler Halford, Kyle Collinsworth, Nate Austin, Eric Mika
San Francisco: Matt Glover, Avry Holmes, Kruize Pinkins, Mark Tollefsen, Cole Dickerson

Pacific
Broadcasters: Barry Tompkins and Dan Belluomini
Series History: BYU leads 4-3
Starting Lineups: 
BYU: Kyle Collinsworth, Tyler Haws, Skyler Halford, Nate Austin, Eric Mika
Pacific: Trevin Harris, Tony Gill, Khalil Kelley, T.J. Wallace, Andrew Bock

Saint Mary's
Broadcasters: Beth Mowins and Kara Lawson
Series History: BYU leads 9-6
Starting Lineups: 
BYU: Tyler Haws, Skyler Halford, Kyle Collinsworth, Nate Austin, Eric Mika
Saint Mary's: Brad Waldow, Kerry Carter, Stephen Holt, Beau Levesque, James Walker III

Gonzaga
Broadcasters: Dave Flemming and Miles Simon
Series History: Gonzaga leads 6-2
Starting Lineups: 
BYU: Kyle Collinsworth, Tyler Haws, Anson Winder, Nate Austin, Josh Sharp
Gonzaga: Kyle Dranginis, Kevin Pangos, David Stockton, Przemek Karnowski, Sam Dower Jr.

Portland
Broadcasters: Spencer Linton, Blaine Fowler, and Lauren Francom
Series History: BYU leads 9-1
Starting Lineups: 
BYU: Kyle Collinsworth, Tyler Haws, Anson Winder, Nate Austin, Luke Worthington
Portland: Bryce Pressley, Bobby Sharp, Thomas Van Der Mars, Ryan Nicholas, David Carr

San Diego
Broadcasters: Steve Quis and Jon Crispin
Series History: BYU leads 7-2
Starting Lineups: 
BYU: Kyle Collinsworth, Tyler Haws, Anson Winder, Nate Austin, Luke Worthington
San Diego: Christopher Anderson, Johnny Dee, Brett Bailey, Jito Kok, Dennis Kramer

Loyola Marymount
Broadcasters: Dave McCann and Blaine Fowler
Series History: BYU leads 5-4
Starting Lineups: 
BYU: Kyle Collinsworth, Tyler Haws, Anson Winder, Nate Austin, Luke Worthington
LMU: Evan Payne, Anthony Ireland, Nick Stover, Alex Osborne, Gabe Levin

San Francisco
Broadcasters: Dave Flemming and Sean Farnham
Series History: BYU leads 10-7
Starting Lineups: 
BYU: Kyle Collinsworth, Tyler Haws, Anson Winder, Nate Austin, Eric Mika
USF: Matt Glover, Avry Holmes, Kruize Pinkins, Mark Tollefsen, Cole Dickerson

WCC Championship: Gonzaga
Broadcasters: Dave Flemming and Sean Farnham (ESPN); Dave Ryan and Bill Frieder (Westwood One)
Series History: Gonzaga leads 6-3
Starting Lineups: 
BYU: Kyle Collinsworth, Tyler Haws, Anson Winder, Nate Austin, Eric Mika
Gonzaga: Kyle Dranginis, Kevin Pangos, David Stockton, Przemek Karnowski, Sam Dower Jr.

NCAA Tournament: Oregon
Broadcasters: Ian Eagle, Jim Spanarkel, and Lewis Johnson (TruTV); Wayne Larrivee and Kelly Tripucka (Westwood One) 
Series History: Oregon leads 13-9
Starting Lineups: 
BYU- Tyler Haws, Matt Carlino, Anson Winder, Nate Austin, Eric Mika
Oregon- Joseph Young, Mike Moser, Johnathan Loyd, Damyean Dotson, Waverly Austin

Rankings

References

BYU Cougars men's basketball seasons
BYU
BYU
BYU Cougars men's basketball
BYU Cougars men's basketball